Euchondrus ramonensis is a species of air-breathing land snail, a terrestrial pulmonate gastropod mollusk in the family Enidae.

The survival of this land snail species is critically endangered.

Distribution
This species is endemic to Israel.

References

Enidae
Gastropods described in 1988
Taxonomy articles created by Polbot